Hillforts in Latvia offered not only military and administrative functions but they were also cultural and economic centres of some regions. The Latvian word for hillfort is pilskalns (plural: pilskalni), from pils (castle) and kalns (hill). Latvian hillforts generally were a part of a complex consisting of the main fortress, the settlement around it, one or more burial fields and nearby ritual sites. The first hillforts in Latvia, such as Daugmale hillfort, appeared during the Bronze Age. Some were continuously inhabited until the late Iron Age.

During the Roman Iron Age, some of the Latvian hillforts (like Ķivutkalns) were abandoned or became sparsely populated. A new period in hillfort development started during the 5th-8th centuries AD, when many new hillforts appeared, in most cases, along the main trades routes - rivers. During the 10th-11th centuries, some of the hillforts became military fortresses with strong fortifications (like hillforts in Tērvete, Talsi, Mežotne). Some of them are considered important political centres of the local peoples, who in this period were subjects of serious social political changes. That period was known for unrest and military activities, as well as power struggles between local aristocracy. Most of the Latvian hillforts were destroyed or abandoned during the Livonian Crusade in the 13th century, but some were still used in the 14th century. In total, there are about 470 hillforts in Latvia.

Latgale

 Asotes hill fort 
 Gribuļu hill fort
 Jersikas hill fort
 Kalvānu hill fort
 Kiuku hill fort
 Markovas hill fort
 Ratinīku hill fort
 Rēzeknes hill fort 
 Silinīku hill fort
 Šokolādes hill fort
 Volkenbergas hill fort

Selonia
 Dignājas hill fort
 Grūbeles hill fort
 Kalkūnes hill fort
 Kaupres hill fort
 Kņāvu hill fort
 Lašu hill fort
 Sēlpils hill fort 
 Sērpiņu hill fort
 Stupeļu hill fort 
 Zilais kalns hill fort

Semigallia
 Daugmales hill fort
 Tērvetes hill fort 
 Incēnu hill fort 
 Mežotnes hill fort 
 Raktes hill fort
 Spārnu hill fort 
 Svētkalns hill fort
 Babītes hill fort
 Sidrabenes hill fort

Courland
 Aizputes hill fort
 Alsungas hill fort
 Ārlavas hill fort
 Buses (Matkule) hill fort 
 Dundagas hill fort
 Dzintares hill fort
 Embūtes hill fort
 Grobiņas hill fort
 Kandavas hill fort 
 Kazdangas hill fort
 Mežītes hill fort 
 Padures hill fort
 Pūres hill fort 
 Puzes hill fort
 Sabiles hill fort
 Talsu hill fort 
 Tukuma hill fort
 Ugāles hill fort
 Valtaiķu hill fort
 Vārtājas hill fort
 Veckuldīgas hill fort 
 Vecmoku hill fort

Vidzeme
 Aizkraukles hill fort 
 Augstais hill fort
 Avotiņkalns hill fort
 Beverīna hill fort
 Dārznīcas hill fort
 Drusku hill fort 
 Gribažu hill fort
 Kastrānes hill fort
 Kārtenes hill fort
 Kokneses hill fort
 Kubeseles hill fort
 Ķentes hill fort
 Ķivutkalns hill fort
 Ķoderu hill fort 
 Metimnes hill fort
 Obzerkalns hill fort
 Oliņkalns hill fort
 Puduļu hill fort
 Pļaviņu hill fort
 Remines hill fort
 Riekstu hill fort
 Satezeles hill fort
 Sārumkalns hill fort
 Tanīsa hill fort
 Tempļa hill fort
 Ureles hill fort
 Zilaiskalns hill fort

See also

 contains a common list of castles, fortresses, forts, an hillforts.
List of hillforts in Lithuania

References

Bibliography

External links
Hillforts in Latvia

Hillforts
Latvia